Eulimetta is a genus of medium-sized sea snails, marine gastropod mollusks in the family Eulimidae.

Species

There is only one known species within this genus:
 Eulimetta pagoda Warén, 1992

References

External links
 To World Register of Marine Species

Eulimidae